Na Tan is a district (amphoe) in the northeastern part of Ubon Ratchathani province, northeastern Thailand.

History
Na Tan area was separated from Khemarat district to create a minor district (king amphoe) on 30 April 1994.

On 15 May 2007, all 81 minor districts were upgraded to full districts. On 24 August the upgrade became official.

Geography
Neighboring districts are (from the south clockwise) Pho Sai and Khemarat. To the east across the Mekong River is the Laotian province of Salavan.

The important water resource is the Mekong.

Administration
The district is divided into four sub-districts (tambons), which are further subdivided into 64 villages (mubans). There are no municipal (thesaban) areas, and four tambon administrative organizations (TAO).

References

External links
amphoe.com

Na Tan
Populated places on the Mekong River